Avoly is a panchayath located in Ernakulam district of the Indian state of Kerala. The panchayath is a part of Muvattupuzha taluk and consists of 14 wards which include Anikkad, Kavana, Kizhakkekara, Kottapuram, Nadukkara, and Pareeka Peedika.

Avoly comes under the Muvattupuzha assembly constituency which is coming under Idukki parliamentary constituency. A major educational institution in Kerala, Nirmala College situated at Avoly panchayath.

History 
Avoly panchayath was formed in 1953. The first meeting of the Panchayat was held on August 15, 1953 and K. V. Emmanuel Karuppamadam became the first president. It has an area of 18.6 km2 and shares the borders with Ayavana Panchayath and Muvattupuzha Municipality in the North, Manjalloor panchayath and Manakkad Panchayath in the South, Manjallor panchayath and Ayavana panchayath in the East and Arakuzha panchayath and Muvattupuzha Municipality in the West.

Demographics 
In 2001 Avoly had a population of 15760 with 7935 males and 7825 females with a literacy rate of 93.9%. The town is mainly made up of Syrian Catholic Christians, Hindus and Muslims.

Wards 
 Kizhakkekkara
 Randar
 Kottappuram
 Thiruvumplavu Kshetram
 St.sebastian.h.s
 Pareekkapeedika
 Kavana
 Kavana Gov. LPS
 Nadukkara
 Panchayath Office
 Anicadu
 P.h.c
 Companippady
 Nirmala College

Economy 
Rubber, pineapple, and coconut are the main cultivation of this village.

Places in and around Avoly 
 Vazhakulam
 Ayavana
 Muvattupuzha
 Mullappuzhachal

See also 
 Muvattupuzha taluk
 Vazhakulam
 Vazhakulam pineapple

References

External links 
 

Villages in Ernakulam district